Agolada is a municipality in Galicia, Spain in the province of Pontevedra.

Administration 

It is divided into 24 parròquies (parishes) with many different patron saints. They are: Agra (San Miguel), Artoño (Santalla), A Baíña (San Pedro), Basadre (Santa María), Berredo (Santa María), Borraxeiros (San Cristovo), Brántega (San Lourenzo), Brocos (San Miguel), Carmoega (San Pedro), Eidián (Santiago), Esperante (San Cibrao), Ferreiroa (San Pedro), Gurgueiro (San Miguel), Merlín (San Pedro), Órrea (Santo André), Ramil (San Martiño), San Paio de Bais (San Paio), Santa Comba (San Xoán), Sesto (San Cibrao), O Sexo (Santiago), As Trabancas (San Mamede), Val de Sangorza (Santa María), Ventosa (San Xulián), Vilariño (Santa María).

References

Municipalities in the Province of Pontevedra